The 1968–69 Idaho Vandals men's basketball team represented the University of Idaho during the 1968–69 NCAA University Division basketball season. Charter members of the Big Sky Conference, the Vandals were led by third-year head coach Wayne Anderson and played their home games on campus at the Memorial Gymnasium in Moscow, Idaho.

Expected to contend for the Big Sky title, they were 11–15 overall (6–9 in Big Sky, third), ending with five wins in their final seven games.

References

External links
Sports Reference – Idaho Vandals: 1968–69 basketball season
Gem of the Mountains: 1969 University of Idaho yearbook – 1968–69 basketball season
Idaho Argonaut – student newspaper – 1969 editions

Idaho
Idaho Vandals men's basketball seasons
Idaho Basketball, Men's
Idaho Basketball, Men's